Kannada Prabha is a morning daily jointly owned by Jupiter Capital a company founded by Rajeev Chandrasekhar who is Bharatiya Janata Party’s member of parliament and The New Indian Express Group, is a major Kannada newspaper in Karnataka. The tag line on its masthead is The Most Powerful Kannada Newspaper. It was founded by Ramnath Goenka.

History
Started on 4 November 1967 with one edition in Bengaluru, today this newspaper, headquartered in Bengaluru is spread across the state with 5 other publication centers viz. Gulbarga, Mangalore, Shivamogga, Hubballi, Belagavi and chithradurga Kalaburagi.

Jupiter Capital, owned by Rajeev Chandrasekhar purchased a 51% stake in the newspaper in 2011. Ravi Hegde took charge as Editor in Chief in January 2017.

Kannada Prabha has won the Karnataka Media Academy award for the Best Designed Newspaper successively, three times since the inception of the award in 2005.

Sister publications 
 The New Indian Express, an Indian English-language broadsheet daily newspaper
 Sakhi, a fortnightly Kannada language women's interest magazine
 Kannada Prabha paper, a daily news publication to help people throughout Karnataka, it features national & international news, current affairs, political news, sports, entertainment and the sharemarket

See also
 List of Kannada-language newspapers
 List of Kannada-language magazines
 List of newspapers in India
 Media in Karnataka
 Media of India

References

External links
 Kannada Prabha ePaper

Daily newspapers published in India
Kannada-language newspapers
Newspapers published in Bangalore
1967 establishments in Mysore State
Newspapers established in 1967